Washington County is a county located in the U.S. state of Iowa. As of the 2020 census, the population was 22,565. The county seat is Washington.

Washington County is included in the Iowa City Metropolitan Statistical Area.

History
Washington County was originally formed in 1838 as Slaughter County in honor of William B. Slaughter, the secretary of Wisconsin Territory. The county, still named Slaughter County, became part of Iowa Territory on July 4, 1838, when it was organized. To honor George Washington, the county opted to change its name on January 25, 1839. The first settlers arrived in Washington County in 1835. The homesteads did not start until 1836. A town, Astoria, was built in the present township of Oregon; it became the first county seat and housed the first court house. The county seat was moved to the city of Washington in 1839.

The first religious society, organized by Reverend J.L. Kirkpatrick, a Methodist minister was created  in 1839. The first newspaper was established in 1853; it was published for two years. In 1856 another newspaper started up; it has continued to the present. The major waterways through Washington County are the Skunk and English Rivers, and Crooked Creek. Timber is found in abundance around these waterways, which has allowed a timber industry to grow up. In 1855 Washington hosted the county's first bank. The county population swelled after 1858, when a railway line belonging to the Mississippi and Missouri Railroad was laid there.

Geography

Major highways
 U.S. Highway 218
 Iowa Highway 1
 Iowa Highway 22
 Iowa Highway 27
 Iowa Highway 78
 Iowa Highway 92

Adjacent counties
Iowa County  (northwest)
Johnson County  (northeast)
Louisa County  (east)
Henry County  (southeast)
Jefferson County  (southwest)
Keokuk County  (west)

Demographics

2000 census

As of the census of 2000, there were 20,670 people, 8,056 households, and 5,631 families residing in the county. The racial makeup of the county was 97.04% White, 0.29% Black or African American, 0.19% Native American, 0.25% Asian, 0.03% Pacific Islander, 1.51% from other races, and 0.68% from two or more races. 2.73% of the population were Hispanic or Latino of any race.

There were 8,056 households, out of which 31.40% had children under the age of 18 living with them, 60.30% were married couples living together, 6.70% had a female householder with no husband present, and 30.10% were non-families. 26.40% of all households were made up of individuals, and 12.50% had someone living alone who was 65 years of age or older. The average household size was 2.50 and the average family size was 3.04.

In the county, the population was spread out, with 26.10% under the age of 18, 7.00% from 18 to 24, 26.80% from 25 to 44, 22.30% from 45 to 64, and 17.90% who were 65 years of age or older. The median age was 39 years. For every 100 females, there were 93.00 males. For every 100 females age 18 and over, there were 90.10 males.

The median income for a household in the county was $39,103, and the median income for a family was $45,636. Males had a median income of $29,592 versus $22,818 for females. The per capita income for the county was $18,221. About 5.10% of families and 7.60% of the population were below the poverty line, including 10.30% of those under age 18 and 7.30% of those age 65 or over.

2010 census
There were 9,516 housing units, of which 8,741 were occupied.

2020 census
There were 9,573 housing units, of which 8,916 were occupied.

Education
The county is served by 3 school districts
Highland Community School District
Mid-Prairie Community School District
Washington Community School District.

Highland Community School District includes:
 Highland Elementary School
Highland Middle School
Highland High School

Communities

Cities

Ainsworth
Brighton
Coppock
Crawfordsville
Kalona
Riverside
Washington
Wellman
West Chester

Unincorporated communities

Noble
Rubio
Haskins

Townships

 Brighton
 Cedar
 Clay
 Crawford
 Dutch Creek
 English River
 Franklin
 Highland
 Iowa
 Jackson
 Lime Creek
 Marion
 Oregon
 Seventy-Six
 Washington

Population ranking
The population ranking of the following table is based on the 2020 census of Washington County.

† county seat

Politics

See also

Washington County Courthouse
National Register of Historic Places listings in Washington County, Iowa

References

External links

Washington County government's website

 
1838 establishments in Wisconsin Territory
Populated places established in 1838
Iowa City metropolitan area